Royce Bernard Adams Jr. (born May 3, 1988) is a Canadian football defensive back who is currently a free agent. He was signed by the Pittsburgh Power of the Arena Football League (AFL) as an undrafted free agent in 2010. Signed by the New York Jets of the National Football League (NFL) in 2012 He played college football at Purdue.

Early years
He transferred from Lakewood St. Edward High School to Glenville High School for his senior in which he recorded seven interceptions for the season. His head coach at Glenville High School was Ted Ginn Sr., the father of Carolina Panthers wide receiver and punt returner Ted Ginn Jr.

College career
He played at Purdue University. He finished with 91 tackles, one interception, 3 passes defended and a forced fumble.

In his senior season, he finished the season with 6 tackles.

In his junior season, he played in 12 games, recording 18 tackles for the season. On October 18, 2008, he recorded a career high 10 tackles against Northwestern but Purdue loss that game 48–26.

In his sophomore year, he played in 13 games. he finished the season with 30 tackles and a passes defended. On October 13, 2007, he had 4 tackles in a game against Michigan in which Purdue loss 48–21.

In his freshman year, he played in 14 games in which he recorded 37 tackles, one interception, 2 passes defended and a forced fumble. On October 14, 2006, he had 2 tackles, an interception and a pass deflection against Northwestern as Purdue won the game. On November 4, 2006, he recorded 2 tackles and a forced fumble against Michigan State as Purdue wins the game 17–15.

Professional career

Pittsburgh Power
On November 22, 2010, he signed with the Pittsburgh Power of the Arena Football League. He finished the 2011 season with 47 tackles and a forced fumble.

New York Jets
On January 5, 2012, Adams signed with the New York Jets.

On July 31, 2012, he was placed on injured reserve because of a knee injury in which he suffered during the offseason. He was released on August 31, 2013.

Cleveland Browns
He was signed by the Cleveland Browns on February 12, 2014. The Browns released Adams on August 25, 2014.

Orlando Predators
On November 20, 2015, Adams was assigned to the Orlando Predators. He was placed on recallable reassignment on March 22, 2016.

References

External links
 Purdue bio
 New York Jets bio
 Cleveland Browns bio

1988 births
Living people
People from South Euclid, Ohio
Players of American football from Cleveland
American football cornerbacks
American football wide receivers
Canadian football defensive backs
Purdue Boilermakers football players
Pittsburgh Power players
New York Jets players
Cleveland Browns players
Blacktips (FXFL) players
Orlando Predators players
BC Lions players
Saskatchewan Roughriders players